Travnik is a town and a municipality in Bosnia and Herzegovina. It is the administrative center of Central Bosnia Canton of the Federation of Bosnia and Herzegovina. As of 2013, the town had a population of 15,344 inhabitants, while the municipality had 53,482 inhabitants.

Historically, it was the capital city of the governors of Bosnia from 1699 to 1850, and has a cultural heritage dating from that period.

Geography 

The river Lašva passes through the town, flowing from west to east before joining the Bosna. Travnik itself is built in the large Lašva valley, which connects the Bosna river valley in the east with the Vrbas river valley in the west.

Its most distinguishing geographic feature are its mountains, Vilenica and Vlašić.

A large karst spring, the Plava Voda wellspring, rises under Vlašić mountain, just below Travnik Castle, in the very center of Old Town of Travnik.

Climate
Travnik has a continental climate, located between the Adriatic sea to the South and Pannonia to the North. Average winter temperature on the other hand is a cold . It snows in Travnik every year.

History
Although there is evidence of some settlement in the region dating back to the Bronze Age, the true history of Travnik begins during the first few centuries AD. Dating from this time there are numerous indications of Roman settlement in the region, including graves, forts, the remains of various other structures, early Christian basilicas, etc. In the town itself, Roman coins and plaques have been found.

In the Middle Ages the Travnik area was known as the župa Lašva province of the medieval Bosnian Kingdom. The area is first mentioned by Bela IV of Hungary in 1244. Travnik itself was one of a number of fortified towns in the region, with its fortress Kaštel becoming today's old town sector. The town itself is first mentioned by the Ottomans during their conquest of nearby Jajce.

After the Ottoman conquest of Bosnia in the 15th century, much of the local population converted to Islam. The town quickly grew into one of the more important settlements in the region, as authorities constructed mosques, marketplaces, and various infrastructures. During 1699 when Sarajevo was set afire by soldiers of Field-Marshal Prince Eugene of Savoy, Travnik became the capital of the Ottoman province of Bosnia and residence of the Bosnian viziers. The town became an important center of government in the entire western frontier of the empire, and consulates were established by the governments of France and Austria-Hungary.

The period of Austrian occupation brought westernization and industry to Travnik, but also a reduction of importance. While cities such as Banja Luka, Sarajevo, Tuzla, and Zenica grew rapidly, Travnik changed so little that during 1991 it had a mere 30,000 or so people, with 70,000 in the entire municipality.

A large fire started by a spark from a locomotive in September 1903 destroyed most of the town's buildings and homes, leaving only some hamlets and the fortress untouched. The cleanup and rebuilding took several years.

From 1922 to 1929, Travnik was the capital of the Travnik Oblast. From 1929 to 1941, Travnik was part of the Drina Banovina of the Kingdom of Yugoslavia.

During the Bosnian War, the town mostly escaped damage from conflict with Serbian forces, hosting refugees from nearby Jajce, but the area experienced fighting between local Bosniak and Croat factions before the Washington Agreement was signed in 1994. After the war, Travnik was made the capital of the Central Bosnia Canton.

Administration 

Travnik is the administrative centre of the Municipality of Travnik, whose area of jurisdiction covers the town of Travnik itself and 89 other rural settlements. Travnik is also the capital of the Central Bosnia Canton, one of the ten Cantons of Bosnia. The municipality government has various bureau's dedicated to help in the running of the region, ranging from the bureau of urbanization and construction, to the bureau of refugees and displaced persons.

Economy
The economy of the Travnik region suffered greatly during the war period of the early 1990s. In 1981 Travnik's GDP per capita was 63% of the Yugoslav average. Nowadays, most of the region deals with typical rural work such as farming and herding. As for urban industry, Travnik has several factories producing everything from matches to furniture. Food processing is also a strong industry in the region, especially meat and milk companies.

Tourism

Like many Bosnian towns, Travnik's tourism is based largely on its history and geography. Nearby Mount Vlašić is one of the tallest peaks in Bosnia and Herzegovina, and an excellent spot for skiing, hiking and sledding. Whilst tourism is not very strong for the town, Mount Vlašić is probably its chief tourist attraction. The town is also of interest: numerous structures dating to the Ottoman era have survived in near perfect condition, such as numerous mosques, oriental homes, two clock towers (sahat kula; Travnik is the only town in Bosnia and Herzegovina to have two clock towers) and fountains. The town's old town dates back to the early 15th century, making it one of the most popular widely accessible sites from that time.

Demographics

Population

Ethnic composition

Culture

Travnik has a strong culture, mostly dating back to its time as the center of local government in the Ottoman Empire. Travnik has a popular old town district however, which dates back to the period of Bosnian independence during the first half of the 15th century. Numerous mosques and churches exist in the region, as do tombs of important historical figures and excellent examples of Ottoman architecture. The town museum, built in 1950, is one of the more impressive cultural institutions in the region.

One of the main works of Ivo Andrić, a native of Travnik, is the Bosnian Chronicle (or Travnik Chronicle), depicting life in Travnik during the Napoleonic Wars and itself written during World War II.

The Bosnian Tornjak, one of Bosnia's two major dog breeds and national symbol, originated in the area, found around Vlašić mountain.

Sport
The local football team is NK Travnik, established in 1922.

Notable people
Ivo Andrić, writer and the 1961 winner of the Nobel Prize for literature
Miroslav Ćiro Blažević, professional football manager and player
Muharem Bazdulj Bosnian novelist and journalist.
Nura Bazdulj-Hubijar Bosnian poet and novelist.
Josip and Zlatko Pejaković, artist brothers, actor and musicians
Davor Džalto, artist, art historian, theologian and philosopher
Nikša Bratoš, composer and arranger of contemporary music
Oliver Frljić, theatre director
Vjekoslav Kramer, chef
Sena Jurinac, operatic soprano
Solomon Gaon, Sephardic Rabbi and Hakham
Mirosław Ferić, fighter pilot
Nikola Mandić, politician
Zlata Bartl, scientist and is the creator of Vegeta
Frano Zubić, Bosnian Franciscan
Larisa Cerić, judoka and European Championship silver medalist
Mladen Solomun, DJ and music producer
Vildana Selimbegović, journalist and editor of Oslobođenje

Twin towns – sister cities

Travnik is twinned with:

 İzmit, Turkey
 Karpoš, North Macedonia
 Kırıkkale, Turkey
 Leipzig, Germany
 Makarska, Croatia
 Pendik, Turkey
 Police nad Metují, Czech Republic
 Yalova, Turkey

Gallery

References

External links

 Travnik official website
 Dnevnik srednje bosne
 Internacionalni Univerzitet Travnik
 Information about town
 Travnik — A town guide 

 
Populated places in Travnik